The New Times is a national English language newspaper in Rwanda. It was established in 1995 shortly after the end of the 1994 genocide. The paper states that it is privately owned, with two shareholders. They also used to have a Kinyarwanda-language weekly called Izuba Rirashe.

The New Times is published in Kigali from Monday to Saturday, with its sister paper the Sunday Times, appearing on Sundays. The New Times Online was launched in 2006. The New Times often conveys optimistic stories about events in Rwanda.

In May 2009 Human Rights Watch (HRW) described The New Times as a state-owned newspaper in a rebuttal to an editorial article that accused HRW of sanitizing people who were attempting to negate the 1994 genocide in Rwanda. The New Times did not publish the HRW rebuttal. President Paul Kagame has said that The New Times has been too servile to him and his party, and has asked the Aga Khan to launch an alternative.

References

External links

 The New Times

English-language newspapers published in Africa
Publications established in 1995
Newspapers published in Rwanda